Gleofilo Vlijter (born 17 September 1999) is a Surinamese footballer who plays for Israeli side Hapoel Ramat Gan and the Suriname national team.

Club career

Youth career 
Vlijter started his career with S.V. Robinhood of the SVB Hoofdklasse, the highest level of football in Suriname. He was with the club since at least December 2013. In May 2014, he was invited to a football clinic in Suriname sponsored by Chelsea.

In January 2015, while a member of the Phoenix All Stars Football Academy in Jamaica, Vlijter traveled to Europe for the first time as he was invited to a trial with Belgian top-division club Genk. At that time, he received a letter of recommendation from the club to apply for a visa. However, a deal with that club and another with KV Oostende fell through and the player returned to Suriname.

In October 2016 it was announced that Vlijter and fellow Surinamese youth international Ayad Godlieb were on trial with Feyenoord Rotterdam of the Dutch Eredivisie. It was expected that they would be signed to a contract with the club's academy in January 2017 if they could acquire work visas. The pair of players first trialed with the club in September 2016 while still playing for S.V. Robinhood in Suriname.

On 9 January 2018 he signed for the youth team of Ironi Kiryat Shmona for the remainder of the season with a club option for further three years.

Senior career 
After one season with the Israeli club in which he was primarily a member of the reserve team he signed for FC Torpedo Kutaisi of the Georgian Erovnuli Liga. He joined as the team was preparing to enter the preliminary round of the 2018–19 UEFA Champions League.

In August 2019 it was announced that Vlijter had signed a two-year contract with Aris Limassol of the Cypriot Second Division.
In his first unofficial match with Aris Limassol, he scored a hat-trick against AEZ. He made his league debut for Aris in a 0–1 loss to Alki Oroklini.

On 4 August 2020, Vlijter signed a three-year deal with Israeli Premier League club Beitar Jerusalem.

Personal life
Gleofilo is the cousin of Surinamese internationals Nigel Hasselbaink and Roscello Vlijter.His dad also played in the SVB Hoofdklasse

International career
Vlijter represented Suriname at the U15 and U16 levels. During a U15 tournament held in French Guiana in late 2013, he was identified by the coaching staff as one of four players who impressed the most. He made his senior international debut at age 15 on 30 April 2015 in a friendly against Guyana.

Vlijter won the Golden Boot Award for the 2019–20 CONCACAF Nations League after scoring ten goals in six matches in League B. In June 2021 Vlijter was named to Suriname's 23-man squad for the 2021 CONCACAF Gold Cup. On 16 July 2021 he scored Suriname's first-ever CONCACAF Gold Cup goal in a 1–2 defeat to Costa Rica.

Career statistics

Club

International

Scores and results list Suriname's goal tally first.

Honours

Individual
CONCACAF Nations League Top Scorer: 2019–20

References

External links
 
 Caribbean Football Database profile 

1999 births
Living people
Surinamese footballers
Suriname international footballers
Surinamese expatriate footballers
SVB Eerste Divisie players
Hapoel Ironi Kiryat Shmona F.C. players
FC Torpedo Kutaisi players
Aris Limassol FC players
Beitar Jerusalem F.C. players
Hapoel Ramat Gan F.C. players
Erovnuli Liga players
Cypriot First Division players
Israeli Premier League players
Liga Leumit players
Expatriate footballers in Israel
Expatriate footballers in Georgia (country)
Expatriate footballers in Cyprus
Surinamese expatriate sportspeople in Israel
Surinamese expatriate sportspeople in Georgia (country)
Surinamese expatriate sportspeople in Cyprus
2021 CONCACAF Gold Cup players
People from Sipaliwini District
Association football forwards